Acacia undosa is a shrub of the genus Acacia and the subgenus Plurinerves that is endemic to an area of south western Australia.

Description
Like most species of Acacia it has phyllodes rather than true leaves. It blooms from July to September and produces yellow flowers. The simple inflorescences occur in pairs in the axils and have spherical flower-heads with a diameter of  containing 18 to 20 golden coloured flowers.

Taxonomy
The species was first formally described by the botanists Richard Sumner Cowan and Bruce Maslin in 1995 as a part of the work Acacia Miscellany. Five groups of microneurous species of Acacia (Leguminosae: Mimosoideae: section Plurinerves), mostly from Western Australia as published in the journal Nuytsia. It was reclassified as Racosperma undosum by Leslie Pedley in 2003 then transferred back to genus Acacia in 2006.

Distribution
It is native to an area in the Wheatbelt region of Western Australia where it is commonly situated in low-lying areas or on undulating plains growing in sandy clay or sandy-loamy soils. The range of the plant extends from around Bruce Rock and Tammin in the north down to near Lake Grace in the south west and Lake King in the south east where it is often a part of open shrub mallee communities.

See also
List of Acacia species

References

undosa
Acacias of Western Australia
Taxa named by Bruce Maslin
Taxa named by Richard Sumner Cowan
Plants described in 1995